Northwest Stampede is a 1948 American contemporary Northwestern film produced and directed by Albert S. Rogell. It stars Joan Leslie and James Craig. The film was shot in Cinecolor in Alberta and features the Calgary Stampede. Joan Leslie had been suspended by Warner Bros. and it was the second of two films she made for 
Eagle-Lion films.

Plot

Cast
Joan Leslie   ...  Chris Johnson  
James Craig   ...  Dan Bennett  
Jack Oakie   ...  Mike Kirby  
Chill Wills   ...  Mileaway  
Victor Kilian   ...  Mel Saunders  
Stanley Andrews   ...  Bowles  
Ray Bennett  ...  Barkis  
Lane Chandler   ...  Scrivner  
 Flame  ...  Dan's Dog

Production
The film was financed by a $650,000 loan from the Bank of America. When the producer failed to repay this because the film failed to earn enough money, the bank took over the film.

References

External links

1948 films
Films directed by Albert S. Rogell
1948 Western (genre) films
American Western (genre) films
Cinecolor films
Eagle-Lion Films films
Films set in Alberta
Films shot in Calgary
Films about horses
Films adapted into comics
Films scored by Paul Sawtell
1940s American films